Wola Jasienicka  is a village in the administrative district of Gmina Jasienica Rosielna, within Brzozów County, Subcarpathian Voivodeship, in south-eastern Poland.

The village has a population of 670.

References

Wola Jasienicka